The women's 10 metre platform, also reported as high diving or platform diving, was one of four diving events on the Diving at the 1968 Summer Olympics programme. It was the 12th appearance of the event, which has been held at every Olympic Games since the 1912 Summer Olympics.

Competition format
The competition was split into two phases:

Preliminary round (22 October)
Divers performed three compulsory dives with limited degrees of difficulty and one voluntary dive without limits. The twelve divers with the highest scores advanced to the final.
Final (23 October)
Divers performed one compulsory dive with a limited degree of difficulty and two voluntary dives without limits. The final ranking was determined by the combined score with the preliminary round.

Schedule
All times are Central Time Zone (UTC-6)

Results

References

Sources
 

Women
1964
1968 in women's diving
Div